"Love on Top of Love" is a song by Grace Jones released in 1989 as the first single from Jones' ninth studio album Bulletproof Heart .

Background
"Love on Top of Love", subtitled "Killer Kiss" on single releases, was produced by C+C Music Factory's David Cole and Robert Clivilles. Another album track, "On My Way", made the single B-side in the UK, while "Dream", a track available only on Bulletproof Heart CD releases, elsewhere. The song met with considerable success and reached #1 on the Billboard Hot Club Dance Play chart for two weeks in December 1989.

Music video
The music video features Jones wearing a swimsuit and sunglasses in a pool with a black-and-white screen in the background showing her smoking. A subsequent scenes show Jones in bed wearing a swim cap while surrounded by men. Jones originally shot the video with a Danish actor Sven-Ole Thorsen, whom she dated, playing her boyfriend but his scenes were cut out. The video was directed by Greg Gorman.

Track listing
7" single
A. "Love on Top of Love (Killer Kiss)" – 4:57
B. "Dream" – 3:26

UK 7" single
A. "Love on Top of Love (Killer Kiss)" – 4:57
B. "On My Way" – 4:26

12" single
A1. "Love on Top of Love (Killer Kiss)" (The Funky Dred Club Mix) – 6:21
A2. "Love on Top of Love (Killer Kiss)" (The Funky Dred Dub Mix) – 6:26
B1. "Love on Top of Love (Killer Kiss)" (Grace's Swing Mix) – 7:32
B2. "Love on Top of Love (Killer Kiss)" (The Cole & Clivilles Garage House Mix) – 7:45

German 12" single
A. "Love on Top of Love (Killer Kiss)" (The Funky Dred Club Mix) – 6:22
B1. "Love on Top of Love (Killer Kiss)" (The Funky Dred Dub Mix) – 6:27
B2. "Love on Top of Love (Killer Kiss)" (The Cole & Clivilles Garage House Mix) – 7:10

UK CD maxi-single
"Love on Top of Love" (single version) – 5:00
"Love on Top of Love" (garage house mix version) – 7:10
"Love on Top of Love" (swing mix version) – 7:46

UK CD promotional single
"Love on Top of Love" (single version) – 4:36
"Love on Top of Love" (The Funky Dred Club Mix) – 6:21

German CD maxi-single
"Love on Top of Love (Killer Kiss)" (The Funky Dred Club Mix) – 6:22
"Love on Top of Love (Killer Kiss)" (The Funky Dred Dub Mix) – 6:27
"Love on Top of Love (Killer Kiss)" (The Cole & Clivilles Garage House Mix) – 7:10

Chart performance

References

1989 singles
Grace Jones songs
Songs written by Grace Jones
Song recordings produced by Robert Clivillés
1989 songs
Capitol Records singles
House music songs
Freestyle music songs